

About Onward Technologies 
Onward Technologies (ONWARDTEC: NSE) is an Indian multinational software technology outsourcing company specializing in digital and ER&D services, focused on transportation & mobility, industrial equipment & heavy machinery, and healthcare & Med Tech industries. As per its filings with the BSE, it is reported to be headquartered in Mumbai and has 2974 employees across 14 offices in 6 countries as well as offshore development centers in India. As of December 31, 2022, it has one Indian subsidiary and four foreign subsidiaries. The Company’s latest filings with the BSE indicate that it is providing services to the largest 2000 global companies in North America & Europe, and is working with 6 of global Top-10 automotive companies, as well as 5 of global Top-8 heavy machinery companies.

Revenues 
Onward Technologies recorded its highest revenue growth in Q4-FY22 of 13% QoQ at INR 875Mn. In the financial year ended March 31, 2022, the company reported a revenue of INR 3,073Mn with YoY growth at +28%, and with earnings per share at INR 12.17 that amounted to a YoY growth of +180%.

According to its filing with the BSE, the company reported revenues of INR 1158 Min for the quarter ended 31st Dec 2022, which is its highest ever quarterly revenue and year-on-year growth of 50%.

History

1991-1996 
Onward Technologies was founded in August 1991 by Harish Mehta, a first-generation entrepreneur, one of the founders and the first elected Chairman  of the National Association of Software and Service Companies (NASSCOM). The company saw a successful listing at the BSE & NSE in 1995. Harish Mehta has served as an award-winning CEO for the company, having been conferred the honor of ‘CEO of the Year’ in 1996 during an international seminar organized by NMIMS, Tata HRD Network and World HRD Congress. Later, as it continued to pursue international expansion, Onward Technologies consolidated its position as a technology services partner for R&D teams across industries.

1997 - 2010 
In 1997, the company expanded into the USA with its subsidiary, Onward Technologies, Inc. becoming operational. In 1998, the company also set up a branch office in London  Between 2001-2010, the Company had diversified into the Engineering, Research & Development (ER&D) industry while also achieving ISO 9001 & ISO 27001 certifications for its offshore development centers in India. It had also opened offices in Chicago in this interim.

2010 - present 
In May 2016, Jigar Mehta (Harish Mehta’s son) was appointed as the Managing Director. As per the annual report of the company for 2020-21 filed with BSE, the company has achieved Zero Net-Debt and the annual report of the company for 2021-22 filed with BSE confirms that it continues to be Net-Debt Free.  It also delivered a record 28% year-on-year organic revenue growth in financial year ended 31st March 2022. In 2021, the company set up offices in Amsterdam  and Canada  By the end of 2021, Convergent Finance LLP, a private equity firm invested in the company and today owns approximately 24.7% stake.

In November 2021, Onward Technologies was awarded a Business Excellence Award by Dun & Bradstreet, as part of its Business Enterprises of Tomorrow recognition program  and was recognized as the Engineering Partner of the Year in the Overall Technology Excellence category at the 4th Annual Innovation and Technology Inn-Tech 2022 awards. Subsequently, in October 2022, Onward Technologies was awarded Best ER&D Partner for Automotive and Industrial Equipment OEMs at the Quantic Technology Excellence Awards.

Services 
Onward Technologies works across industries that include transportation and mobility, industrial equipment & heavy machinery as well as healthcare & Med Tech. It offers its clients solutions and services across the following business lines: 

●      Digital transformation services like data science, data analytics, automation & cloud

●      Embedded systems & Electronics engineering services 

●      Mechanical engineering services

●      IT services

Global locations

Awards 
●     In November 2021, Onward Technologies was recognized by Dun & Bradstreet as a ‘Business Enterprise of Tomorrow’ for helping its clients accelerate innovation, drive competitiveness, and maximize returns on their R&D investments. 

●     In June 2022, Onward Technologies was recognized as the Engineering Partner of the Year in the Overall Technology Excellence category at the 4th Annual Innovation and Technology Inn-Tech 2022 awards. 

●    In October 2022, Onward Technologies was awarded Best ER&D Partner for Automotive and Industrial Equipment OEMs at the Quantic Technology Excellence Awards

References

External links 
 

Software companies based in Mumbai
Software companies established in 1991
Indian companies established in 1991
1991 establishments in Maharashtra
Companies listed on the National Stock Exchange of India
Companies listed on the Bombay Stock Exchange